Anne Monique Nuyt is a Canadian paediatrician who is Professor of Neonatology and Canada Research Chair in Prematurity and Developmental Origins of Cardiovascular Health and Diseases at the Université de Montréal. Her research considers how perinatal oxidative stress can alter the structural development and function of the cardiovascular system.

Early life and education 
Nuyt trained in medicine at the Université de Sherbrooke. After earning her medical degree, she completed her residency in Sherbrooke, before moving to McGill University for a fellowship in perinatal and neonatal medicine. In 1993, Nuyt joined Iowa State University, where she focused on perinatal cardiovascular physiology. She continued investigating cardiovascular science, supported by the Canadian Institutes of Health Research, at the Collège de France.

Research and career 
Nuyt investigates how oxidative stress after birth impacts the structural development and function of cardiovascular systems. Alongside other ante- and neo-natal factors, these stresses can alter the onset of hypertension in adulthood. Her laboratory performs investigations by studying animal models. She has shown that it is possible to modify a rat's diet and trigger delayed growth in their offspring as well as hypertension in adulthood. Similarly, she has shown that if rats are exposed to high oxygen concentrations in the first days of their lives they experience vascular dysfunction and hypertension. Nuyt is interested in how the mechanisms that underpin the development of hypertension. To evaluate other factors, Nuyt performs clinical trials in mother-child cohorts. She is particularly interested in the development of screening strategies and targeted therapies.

Nuyt has demonstrated that babies born very prematurely (extreme preemies) are considerably more likely to suffer from high blood pressure as adults. She also showed that women who are born prematurely are more like to have their own babies prematurely.

During the COVID-19 pandemic, Canada experienced a surge in the number of young people with eating disorders and suicidal thoughts. Nuyt called for the prioritisation of adolescent mental health to limit the long-term consequences of the pandemic on young people. She was elected to the Canadian Academy of Health Sciences in 2021.

Awards and honours 
 2013 Fonds de la Recherche en Santé du Québec Senior Scholar Award
 2016 Hypertension Canada Certificate of Excellence
 2021 Elected Fellow of the Canadian Academy of Health Sciences
 2022 Canada Research Chair

Selected publications

References 

Living people
Université de Sherbrooke alumni
Canada Research Chairs
Canadian pediatricians
Academic staff of the Université de Montréal
20th-century Canadian physicians
21st-century Canadian physicians
Year of birth missing (living people)